Jai Prakash Nishad is an Indian politician. He is a Member of Parliament, representing Uttar Pradesh in the Rajya Sabha the upper house of India's Parliament representing the Bharatiya Janata Party. He was a Minister of State in Uttar Pradesh from 2008-2009.

Personal life
Nishad is a graduate. He completed his studies from D.P.G College Deoria and Deen Dayal Upadhyay Gorakhpur University in 1998.

References

1972 births
Living people
Rajya Sabha members from Uttar Pradesh
Bharatiya Janata Party politicians from Uttar Pradesh
Bahujan Samaj Party politicians from Uttar Pradesh